Norman Bodell (born 29 January 1938) is an English former professional footballer, coach, manager and scout. He played as a defender, making 224 appearances in the Football League for Rochdale, Crewe Alexandra and Halifax Town before moving into non-League football with Altrincham. He played for Rochdale in the final of the 1961–62 League Cup which they lost to Norwich City over two legs.

Bodell left Altrincham, where his playing career ended because of knee ligament damage but where he had continued as coach, to become manager of Barrow in March 1969. He helped them avoid relegation that season, but was sacked the following February with the team heading back down to the Fourth Division. He went on to coach the reserve team at Wolverhampton Wanderers and the first team at Preston North End under Bobby Charlton's management before becoming Jim Smith's assistant at Blackburn Rovers in July 1975. When Smith left Blackburn for Birmingham City in March 1978, Bodell acted as caretaker manager for eight games until Jim Iley was appointed, and then rejoined Smith at Birmingham. This situation was repeated four years later when Smith's dismissal in February 1982 left Bodell as caretaker for two matches until the appointment of Ron Saunders. Bodell remained at Birmingham as coach and as chief scout, a post he went on to hold at West Bromwich Albion.

Honours
Rochdale
 Football League Cup runner-up: 1961–62

References

External links
 
 

1938 births
Living people
Footballers from Manchester
English footballers
Association football defenders
Rochdale A.F.C. players
Crewe Alexandra F.C. players
Halifax Town A.F.C. players
Altrincham F.C. players
English Football League players
English football managers
Barrow A.F.C. managers
Blackburn Rovers F.C. managers
Birmingham City F.C. managers
English Football League managers
Association football coaches